Sümeyye Özcan (born 2 April 2001) is a Liechtensteiner footballer who plays as a midfielder for Triesen and for the Liechtenstein national football team.

International career
Özcan made her senior debut for Liechtenstein in a friendly against Gibraltar on 26 November 2021.

Career statistics

International

References

External links
 Sümeyye Özcan at the Liechtenstein Football Association

2001 births
Living people
Women's association football midfielders
Liechtenstein women's international footballers
Liechtenstein women's footballers